Parectopa lespedezaefoliella is a moth of the family Gracillariidae. It is known from Québec, Canada, and Maine, Pennsylvania, North Carolina and Michigan in the United States.

The larvae feed on Lespedeza species (including Lespedeza violacea), Meibomia species and Robinia species (including Robinia pseudacacia). They mine the leaves of their host plant. The mine has the form of a flat, acutely digitate mine in the upper leaf surface.

References

Gracillariinae
Moths described in 1860